John Carlile may refer to:
 John S. Carlile (1817–1878), United States Senator from Virginia
John Charles Carlile (?–1941), British Baptist minister.
 John Carlile (footballer) (born 1942), Australian rules footballer for South Melbourne

See also
 John  Carlisle (disambiguation)
 John Carlyle (disambiguation)